The 2008 UAE 3rd GP2 Asia Series round was a GP2 Asia Series motor race held on 5 and 6 December 2008 at Dubai Autodrome in Dubai, United Arab Emirates. It was the second round of the 2008–09 GP2 Asia Series.

Classification

Qualifying

Feature race

Sprint race 
The sprint race was cancelled due to flooding due to heavy rainfall.

Standings after the event 

Drivers' Championship standings

Teams' Championship standings

 Note: Only the top five positions are included for both sets of standings.

See also 
 2008 UAE 3rd Speedcar Series round

References

GP2 Asia Series
GP2 Asia